Zodeia may refer to:

 Kato Zodeia, a village in Cyprus
 Pano Zodeia, a village in Cyprus